Karin Kirkpatrick is a Canadian politician who was elected to the Legislative Assembly of British Columbia in the 2020 British Columbia general election. She represents the electoral district of West Vancouver-Capilano as a member of the British Columbia Liberal Party.She currently serves as the Official Opposition critic for Children, Family Development, and Childcare.

Background

Electoral record

References

21st-century Canadian politicians
21st-century Canadian women politicians
British Columbia Liberal Party MLAs
People from West Vancouver
Women MLAs in British Columbia
Living people
Year of birth missing (living people)